The Subansiri Lower Dam, officially named Subansiri Lower Hydroelectric Project (SLHEP), is an under construction gravity dam on the Subansiri River in North Eastern India. Described as a run-of-the-river project by NHPC Limited, the Project is expected to supply 2,000 MW of power when completed. The project has experienced several problems during construction to include landslides, re-design and opposition. It was expected to be complete in 2018. It is notable that, if completed as planned, it will be the largest hydroelectric project in India.

As of early 2019, work was not progressing on either of the two major dam projects in the Assam region, the Dibang and the Lower Subansiri.

After clearance of ‘Subansiri Lower Project’ by Hon’ble NGT vide its Order dated: 31.07.2019, Main works of the Dam has been resumed on 15.10.2019.

Design

At normal level, the reservoir's surface will cover . The surface powerhouse, located on the right bank, will contain eight 250 MW Francis turbine generators.

Construction
Construction of Subansiri Lower Project involves many challenges. These include land not being available when construction was scheduled to commence, a limited annual construction time because of monsoons (from mid-April to mid-October), the need to handle high flood flows and poor rock conditions. The design of the dam has undergone drastic and repeated revisions that have affected the schedule and planning of the construction work.

In December 2003 the contract to build the dam and its associated structures was awarded to a consortium of Boguchandgesstroy, Soyuzgidrosptsstry and Soma Enterprise Ltd. Due to difficulties acquiring land around the site, construction could not begin in earnest until 13 months after the contract was awarded. Unexpected geological conditions at the dam site led to landslides and slower tunnel excavation. By November 2007, the river was successfully diverted and in April of the next year, the foundation was clear for construction. Before the foundation was fully prepared it was discovered that bedrock was reached  sooner than expected. This led to an alteration in the dam's design for stability. While the dam was being re-designed, concrete was placed over the foundation to protect it from the upcoming monsoon floods as the cofferdams stood a good chance of not protecting the foundation from the strong floods. The re-design was completed in October 2008 and soon after the foundation was once again cleared. In May 2009, work was suspended because of the monsoon season and re-commenced in November of that year.

On 16 December 2011, construction equipment was halted by protests.

The construction cost has gone up by about 1,200 crore owing to forced suspension of work since December 2011. NHPC has already spent about 6,600 crore, according to a status report prepared by the company.

Officially expected to be competed in January 2023, the hydroelectric generators will begin generating 500 MW of electricity, gradually increasing to 2000 MW.

Environmental impact
Some environmental impacts unique to very large dams will result from completion of the Subansiri Project, both upstream and downstream of the dam site. These impacts will include ecosystem damage and loss of land.

The reservoir of the Subansiri Project will submerge a  length of the Subansiri river and occupy  which includes Himalayan subtropical pine forests, Himalayan subtropical broadleaf forests, part of the Tale Valley Wildlife Sanctuary, an elephant corridor and some subsistence agriculture fields.

Thirty eight families will be displaced if the dam is completed, according to official data.
Downstream
Water flow downstream will be regulated by the dam which is expected to result in low releases (6 m3/s) during winter and very high releases (2,560 m3/s) when energy is being generated.

The project has met stiff resistance from several groups including All Assam Students’ Union  and the Krishak Mukti Sangram Samiti, who are apprehensive about safety and the project’s downstream impact.

References

Dams in Arunachal Pradesh
Dams in Assam
Dams under construction
Dams in the Brahmaputra River Basin
Proposed infrastructure in Arunachal Pradesh